Oscar's Hotel for Fantastical Creatures is a British-American fantasy comedy web series created by PJ Liguori, Sophie Newton, Louis Grant and Jamie Swarbrick (working collectively under Liguori's username of KickthePJ), and directed by PJ Liguori. The series was produced by New Form Digital, and was first aired digitally via Vimeo On Demand. Oscar's Hotel for Fantastical Creatures set a single day sales record for Vimeo's On-Demand service, according to CEO Kerry Trainor. The episodes were previously available on Vimeo via paid subscription and as of November 2019, they are available on Amazon Prime.

The puppets and costumes are provided by Jim Henson's Creature Shop.

Plot summary
In the British-American web series, Oscar's Hotel for Fantastical Creatures is a hotel establishment run by a man named Oscar Tangolius for a gallery of monstrous residents. When Oscar leaves on important "Cosmic Council" business for a week, he entrusts the establishment and the care of its customers to his nephew Oliver, resulting in chaos.

Characters
 Oscar Tangolius (portrayed by Conor Jatter in the pilot, Andrew Ableson in the series) - The proprietor of Oscar's Hotel for Fantastical Creatures. According to Oscar, his hotel is reachable through the Forever Train, Red’s Taxi Service, and something else "equally bizarre and weird." When the series was first seen as a pilot, Oscar had a different appearance where he sported a longer beard and puffy hair.
 Oliver (portrayed by Chris Kendall) - The nephew of Oscar who works as his assistant. While Oscar was away for a week, Oliver runs the hotel in his absence. In the pilot, Oliver was a medical student who specializes in magical creatures.

Recurring characters
These characters have a major role in more than one episode.

 Octochef (portrayed by Mamrie Hart) - A pink giant octopus that works as the hotel's chef. The costume was designed by Melissa Doss and Robert Bennett while the face makeup was provided by Nix Herrera.
 Red (portrayed by Mitchell Davis) - A red man with long horns who runs Red's Taxi Service which brings guests to the hotel. In the pilot, Red had shorter horns.
 Mo Nay (portrayed by PJ Liguori) - A talking portrait that resides in the hotel and is friends with Oliver.

One-off characters
These characters have a major role in only one episode, although they may appear in minor or background roles in prior or subsequent episodes.

 Party Nightmare (portrayed by Jake Roper) - A disco-themed horse-headed human with a demon face within its mouth who can throw parties. Duncan Daydream was once an ordinary clown until he was transformed into the Party Nightmare upon being bitten by a pony. Anyone shot by his gun parties to the death. The costume was designed by Robert Bennett with special animatronics provided by John Criswell.
 Wiggles the Clown (portrayed by PJ Liguori) - A clown that resides at Oscar's Hotel for Fantastical Creatures. He was the one who told Oliver about Party Nightmare.
 Murray (portrayed by Thomas Ridgewell) - A balloon security guard.
 Stan (portrayed by Bertie Gilbert) - A balloon security guard.
 Jonathan Dullhead #1 (portrayed by Joe Bereta) -
 Jonathan Dullhead #2 (portrayed by Elliot Morgan) -
 Rose (portrayed by Meghan Rienks) - An anthropomorphic rose.
 Crazy Wizard (portrayed by Klarity) - A wizard who is crazy.
 Maus (portrayed by Jack Howard) - An anthropomorphic mouse who works as a bellhop.
 Shark Kid (portrayed by Dean Dobbs) - An anthropomorphic hammerhead shark.
 Snow Creature (portrayed by Nix Herrera) - An unspecified humanoid arctic creature with heads for hands that lives in the hotel's walk-in refrigerator. It was responsible for eating Oliver's robe.
 Food Creatures - A tribe of anthropomorphic foods that are found in the back of the hotel's walk-in refrigerator.
 Ginger Root (performed by Bruce Lanoil, voiced by Carrie Fletcher) - An anthropomorphic ginger root that is one of the Food Creatures.
 Brock (performed by Sean Johnson, voiced by Felix Arvid Ulf Kjellberg) - An anthropomorphic clump of broccoli that is one of the Food Creatures.
 Carrie (performed by Carla Rudy, voiced by Marzia Bisognin) - An anthropomorphic carrot that is one of the Food Creatures.
 Brie (performed by Russ Walko, voiced by Dan Howell) - An anthropomorphic brie cheese slice that is one of the Food Creatures.
 Rash (performed by Patrick Johnson, voiced by Phil Lester) - An anthropomorphic bacon strip that is one of the Food Creatures.
 Sir Loin (performed by Artie Esposito, voiced by Elliott Gould) - An anthropomorphic steak that is one of the Food Creatures.
 Box Death (portrayed by Olan Rogers) - A bunch of boxes in a humanoid-like shape that rules the Box-World-Afterlife.
 Snow Pea (portrayed by Gabbie Hanna) - A long-nosed female from the Box-World-Afterlife.
 Seksiman (portrayed by Rob Michael Hugel) - A half-man half-goat who lives in the Box-World-Afterlife.
 Hermit (portrayed by Grace Helbig) - An anthropomorphic hermit crab who lived in a cave that's underneath the hotel. Her costume was designed by Melissa Doss.
 Manny (portrayed by Steve Zaragoza) - An anthropomorphic mantis who works as the hotel's landscaper.
 Finn the Carp (portrayed by Emma Blackery) -
 White Spirit (portrayed by Anna Akana) - A tentacled creature that destroys paintings with her paint-thinning abilities. Her costume was designed by Gypsy Taylor and her makeup was provided by Chloe Sens.
 Mo Nay Lisa (portrayed by Olga Kay) - A character with a thought bubble above her head that lives in Artlandia.
 Statue Guy (portrayed by Jarrett Sleeper) - A living statue that lives in Artlandia.
 Cubisto (portrayed by Mitchell Davis) - A cube-themed character that lives in Artlandia.
 Sonny (portrayed by Benjamin Cook) -
 Queen Bee (portrayed by Hannah Hart) - An anthropomorphic queen bee who is the Queen of Busybody. Her makeup was provided by Nix Herrera.
 Norbert (voiced by Alfred Molina) - A purple anthropomorphic fish that works with Albert as a Repossession Fish for the company Magical Bill.
 Albert (performed by Kenny Stevenson, voiced by Patrick Stewart) - A green anthropomorphic fish that works with Norbert as a Repossession Fish for the company Magical Bill.
 Fly (portrayed by Toks Olagundoye) - An anthropomorphic fly.
 Bill the Worm (portrayed by Mike Falzone) - A green worm that is used in worm racing.
 Jake the Worm (portrayed by Meghan McCarthy) - A purple worm that is used in worm racing.
 Marzo (portrayed by Mary Doodles) - An insect card dealer that works in the hotel's casino.
 Fuzz (portrayed by PJ Liguori) -

Episodes

Awards and nominations
In 2015, Oscar's Hotel for Fantastical Creatures was nominated at the Shorty Awards in the Best Web Series category. At the 2016 Streamy Awards, the series received four nominations and won three awards.

References

External links
 Official Website
 Oscar's Hotel for Fantastical Creatures at Internet Movie Database

American comedy web series
Fictional hotels
British comedy web series
Web series featuring puppetry
Fantasy comedy web series